Ganta, also known as Gompa City, is a town approximately  from Monrovia in Nimba County of northern Liberia. It is located just south of the Guinea border. It is the second-most populous city in Liberia, with an estimated population of 41,106 as of 2008. A bustling market town, it contains a prominent white mosque, noted for its decorated minarets of carved stars.

Geography
The Mani River passes through the northern part of the town, marking the border between Liberia and Guinea.

Economy 
Ganta is an emerging city with a population of 41,106 as of 2008. As early as 1983 it was observed by the Foreign Broadcast Information Service that it had the potential to become "one of the most developed and commercial cities in rural Liberia". As of 2007 there are five banks in Ganta with other financial institutions. The city contains Jackie's Guest House, the Alvino Hotel, the Beer Garden, Justina Bar and Restaurant etc. In 2004, some 20 acres of land near Ganta were purchased to build a new college, costing $13,500.

Healthcare
American Methodist missionary and physician George Way Harley began working in Ganta in October 1925, where he established a new hospital, dispensary, church, school, and a number of residences. He found a leper colony there at the time, and established a new Mission in Ganta in 1926. Ganta Hospital serves 450,000 people in Nimba County and surrounding areas. as of 2008 it had 32 beds, with the expectation to grow to 50.

In September 2014, it was reported that two female victims of the Ebola virus in Ganta, Dorris Quoi and Ma Kebeh, had been "resurrected".

References

Populated places in Liberia
Nimba County
Guinea–Liberia border crossings